Kamlesh Patel is an Indian politician and member of the Bharatiya Janata Party. Patel was member of the Gujarat Legislative Assembly from 1990 to 2002 from the  Maninagar constituency in Eastern side of city Ahmedabad. He vacated his for  Narendra Modi who reigned from the seat to become Chief Minister of Gujarat. Currently, he is  Chairman of Tourism Corporation of Gujarat Limited.

References 

Politicians from Ahmedabad
Living people
Bharatiya Janata Party politicians from Gujarat
Year of birth missing (living people)
Gujarat MLAs 1990–1995
Gujarat MLAs 1995–1998
Gujarat MLAs 1998–2002